Ingrid Santer (born 9 June 1955) is a German gymnast. She competed at the 1972 Summer Olympics.

References

External links
 

1955 births
Living people
German female artistic gymnasts
Olympic gymnasts of West Germany
Gymnasts at the 1972 Summer Olympics
Sportspeople from Munich